Ghanaian–Surinamese relations are diplomatic relations between Ghana and Suriname. Both countries established diplomatic relations on 24 November 1975. Both countries are members of OACPS and former Dutch colonies.

Suriname maintains an embassy in Accra.
 The current ambassador of Suriname to Ghana is Natasha Halfhuid.

History

Most of the enslaved people imported to Suriname came from West Central Africa (circa 61,500 slaves, 27% of the total number), Gold Coast (Ghana) (circa 46,000, 21% of the total).

The Akans from the central Ghana were, officially, the predominant ethnic group of slaves in Suriname.

Enslaved people including the Ewe (who live in southern Ghana, Togo and Benin)

See also
Afro-Surinamese
Akan people
Dutch Empire
Ewe people
Foreign relations of Ghana
Foreign relations of Suriname
OACPS

References

Foreign relations of Ghana
Foreign relations of Suriname